Adam Dawson was an administrator of the English East India Company. He served as President of Bengal in the mid-eighteenth century.

References

Presidents of Bengal
English businesspeople
British East India Company people
18th-century British people
Year of birth missing
Year of death missing